Higher is the ninth studio album by American singer Regina Belle. It was released by Pendulum Records on June 5, 2012. The album peaked at number 15 on the Billboard Top Gospel Albums chart and number 44 on the Top R&B/Hip-Hop Albums chart. It produced the single "Make an Example Out of Me", which peaked at number 19 on the Billboard Hot Gospel Songs chart.

Critical reception

AllMusic reviewer Steve Leggett wrote that "Belle may not be tracking secular material any longer (she still features her secular hits in her live shows, where they fit comfortably with her newer gospel numbers), but she isn't afraid to use secular music touches from jazz, hip-hop, R&B, and soul in these tracks, creating an energetic and joyous urban pop gospel style that isn't too far removed in sound from her straight pop work. Everybody wins."

Track listing

Charts

References

Regina Belle albums
2012 albums
Pendulum Records albums